Rites of Passage is the fourth studio album by American folk rock duo the Indigo Girls, released on May 12, 1992 by Epic Records. It was reissued and remastered in 2000 with two bonus tracks.

Critical reception

The Washington Post wrote that "the arrangements ... are more colorful and punchy, and every now and then the duo even manages to inject a little welcome humor into its otherwise dreary musings." Trouser Press wrote that producer Peter Collins expunges "the folk patina to reveal a crystalline mainstream pop center around the snappy, subtle rhythms of bassist Sara Lee and drummer Jerry Marotta."

Track listing

Personnel
Indigo Girls
Amy Ray – vocals, guitars
Emily Saliers – vocals, guitars (all tracks except 7)

Additional personnel
Sara Lee – bass (1-5, 8, 9, 11-13 & bonus 1 & 2)
Budgie – drums and percussion (1, 9), marimba and claves (8)
Lisa Germano – fiddle (1, 2, 11, 12)
Ronan Browne – uilleann pipes (1, 13), low whistle (12)
Dónal Lunny – bouzouki and bodhran (1, 13)
Jerry Marotta – drums (2, 3, 6, 9, 11-13 & bonus 1, 2) percussion (2, 3, 6, 9-13 & bonus 1, 2), piano (2)
Talvin Singh – percussion (2, 6, 11, 12)
Martin McCarrick – cello and accordion (2, 8, 11, 12)
Jackson Browne and David Crosby – backing vocals (2, 12)
John Jennings – electric guitar (3, 9, 12), slide guitar (13)
Simone Simonton – cymbals and sidestick (3)
Jai Winding – piano (3)
Michael Kamen – string arrangements, conductor (3)
Kenny Aronoff – drums and percussion (4)
Benmont Tench – organ (4)
Edgar Meyer – acoustic bass (6, 8, 9)
Maggie Roche – backing vocals (8, 10), piano (10)
Terre Roche and Suzzy Roche – backing vocals (8, 10)
Michael Lorant – backing vocals (9)
Sandy Garfinkle – harmonica (11)
Nollaig Ní Chathasaigh (also known as Nollaig Casey) – Irish fiddle (12 13)
Uncredited - harmonica (9)
Jane Scarpantoni – cello (bonus 1, 2)
Scarlet Rivera – violin (bonus 1, 2)

Charts

Certifications

</ref>

References

1992 albums
Albums produced by Peter Collins (record producer)
Epic Records albums
Indigo Girls albums